Sisne ( Sis‍nē Gāum̥pālikā) is a rural municipality in Eastern Rukum District of Lumbini Province Province of Nepal.

Demographics
At the time of the 2011 Nepal census, Sisne Rural Municipality had a population of 18,083. Of these, 99.9% spoke Nepali and 0.1% Sign language as their first language.

In terms of ethnicity/caste, 47.0% were Chhetri, 25.3% Magar, 10.2% Kami, 6.4% Thakuri, 4.7% Hill Brahmin, 4.0% Damai/Dholi, 1.6% Sarki, 0.3% Newar, 0.3% Badi and 0.2% others.

In terms of religion, 97.9% were Hindu, 1.6% Christian, 0.3% Buddhist and 0.2% others.

References

External links
 Official website

Populated places in Eastern Rukum District
Rural municipalities in Eastern Rukum District
Rural municipalities of Nepal established in 2017